Abi Mohamed Al Morjani Mosque  is a small mosque in the Halfaouine hood, in the north of the Medina of Tunis.

Localization
It is located in 33 El Halfaouine Street.

Etymology
The madrasa Marjania and the mosque got their names from their founder, the sheikh Abou Mohamed Al Morjani , a close friend of the saint Abul Hasan ash-Shadhili.

History
According to the commemorative plaque at the entrance, it was built in the 13th century. It is known for its minbar that was made in 1493  and where the chahada is engraved. The mosque was restored between 1963 and 1966.

References 

Mosques in Tunis
13th-century mosques
13th-century establishments in Africa